Aeonium arboreum, the tree aeonium, tree houseleek, or Irish rose, is a succulent, subtropical subshrub in the flowering plant family Crassulaceae.

It is an invasive weed in places outside its natural distribution, for example as a garden escape throughout temperate southern Australia.

Description

Aeonium arboreum grows as a less branched subshrub and reaches stature heights of up to 2 metres. The more or less upright or ascending, smooth, not net-like patterned stem axes have a diameter of 1 to 3 centimetres.

Their leaves are in flattened rosettes with diameters of 10 to 25 centimetres at the end of the stem axes together. Young leaves are pressed tightly together. The obovate to oblate lanceolate leaf blade is pointed toward its apex and wedge-shaped at the base. The green, usually purple-colored, glossy leaf surface is almost bare. The leaf margin is set with curved eyelashes.

The conical to ovate inflorescence has a length of 10 to 25 centimetres and a diameter of 10 to 15 centimetres. The flowers sit on a 2-to-12-millimetre-long, slightly fluffy flower stem. Its sepals are also slightly fluff-haired with a pointed top and wedge-shaped base that is smooth and shiny green, red or purple. The yellow, narrow oblong to lanceolate, pointed petals are 5 to 7 millimetres long and 1.5 to 2 millimetres wide. The stamens are bare. It bears rosettes of leaves and large pyramidal panicles of bright yellow flowers in the spring.

Distribution
The plant is endemic to the western Canary Islands of Tenerife, La Palma, El Hierro, La Gomera and Gran Canaria. The populations found on the Iberian Peninsula, the Moroccan coast and the Mediterranean are likely to be considered neophytes. In temperate regions it needs to be grown under glass.

Cultivation
Aeonium arboreum grows in sunny or slightly shaded places on weathered volcanic soil. The purple cultivar 'Zwartkop' ('Schwartzkopf') has gained the Royal Horticultural Society's Award of Garden Merit. and a variegated form is grown as cultivar 'variegatum'.

Varieties
The following variety names are accepted.

 Aeonium arboreum var. arboreum
 Aeonium arboreum var. holochrysum H.Y.Liu
 Aeonium arboreum var. rubrolineatum (Svent.) H.Y.Liu

Gallery

References

External links
 
House tree-leek.  Retrieved February 7, 2011.

arboreum
Plants described in 1840
Flora of the Canary Islands